Golem is a coastal village and an administrative unit in Tirana County, Albania. A former rural municipality, at the 2015 local government reform it became a subdivision of the municipality Kavajë. The population at the 2011 census was 6,994. The area along the coast is one of Albania's major beach destinations where many resorts, hotels, and vacation homes are located. Golem has experienced rapid urban development and the problems associated with it.

References

Beaches of Albania
Former municipalities in Tirana County
Seaside resorts in Albania
Administrative units of Kavajë
Villages in Tirana County